Deaf Republic: Poems is a poetry book by Ilya Kaminsky which was published on June 18, 2019 by Faber and Faber.

Critical reception and reviews 

Will Brewbaker of Los Angeles Review of Books wrote "Deaf Republic is a masterfully wrought collection" and Kassy Lee of College of Literature, Science, and the Arts wrote "Kaminsky’s Deaf Republic is both rigorous and profound.".

The book has been also reviewed by Karl Kirchwey of The New York Times, Lauren Camp of World Literature Today, Daniel Moysaenko of Chicago Review, Annik Adey-Babinski of The Kenyon Review, Richard Osler of The Literary Review, and Stav Poleg of Poetry School.

Awards and finalists

Best book of the year by 

The New York Times
NPR
The Washington Post
The Times Literary Supplement
Financial Times
The Guardian
The Irish Times
Library Journal
The Daily Telegraph
Slate
Vanity Fair
Literary Hub
HuffPost
New York Public Library

Other awards 

 Anisfield-Wolf Book Award for Poetry
 Los Angeles Times Book Prize for Poetry
 Levis Reading Prize

Finalist 

 PEN/Jean Stein Book Award
 National Book Award for Poetry

References 

American poetry anthologies
2019 poetry books
Faber and Faber books